Generally, a partition is a division of a whole into non-overlapping parts.  Among the kinds of partitions considered in mathematics are
 partition of a set or an ordered partition of a set,
 partition of a graph,
 partition of an integer,
 partition of an interval,
 partition of unity,
 partition of a matrix; see block matrix, and
 partition of the sum of squares in statistics problems, especially in the analysis of variance,
 quotition and partition, two ways of viewing the operation of division of integers.

Integer partitions 

 Composition (number theory)  
 Ewens's sampling formula  
 Ferrers graph  
 Glaisher's theorem  
 Landau's function  
 Partition function (number theory)  
 Pentagonal number theorem  
 Plane partition  
 Quotition and partition  
 Rank of a partition  
 Crank of a partition  
 Solid partition  
 Young tableau  
 Young's lattice

Set partitions 

 Bell number  
 Bell polynomials  
 Dobinski's formula  
 Cumulant  
 Data clustering
 Equivalence relation  
 Exact cover  
 Knuth's Algorithm X  
 Dancing Links  
 Exponential formula  
 Faà di Bruno's formula  
 Feshbach–Fano partitioning
 Foliation  
 Frequency partition  
 Graph partition  
 Kernel of a function  
 Lamination (topology)  
 Matroid partitioning  
 Multipartition  
 Multiplicative partition  
 Noncrossing partition  
 Ordered partition of a set  
 Partition calculus  
 Partition function (quantum field theory)  
 Partition function (statistical mechanics)  
 Derivation of the partition function   
 Partition of an interval  
 Partition of a set  
 Ordered partition  
 Partition refinement
 Disjoint-set data structure
 Partition problem  
 3-partition problem  
 Partition topology  
 Quotition and partition  
 Recursive partitioning  
 Stirling number  
 Stirling transform  
 Stratification (mathematics)  
 Tverberg partition  
 Twelvefold way

In probability and stochastic processes 

 Chinese restaurant process  
 Dobinski's formula  
 Ewens's sampling formula  
 Law of total cumulance  

Partition
Partition topics